Peristylus maingayi, commonly known as the white ogre orchid, is a species of orchid that is native to southern Indochina, New Guinea and north Queensland. It has two or three broad leaves near its base and up to fifteen small white flowers that are tube-shaped near the base and have a three-lobed labellum.

Description 
The lateral sepals are a similar length to the dorsal sepal but slightly narrower and spread apart from each other. Flowering occurs from March to May.

Taxonomy and naming
The white ogre orchid was first formally described in 1897 by George King and Robert Pantling who gave it the name Habenaria maingayi and published the description in Journal of the Asiatic Society of Bengal. In 2001 Jeffrey James Wood and Paul Abel Ormerod changed the name to Peristylus maingayi. The specific epithet (maingayi) honours the collector of the type specimen, Alexander Carroll Maingay.

Distribution and habitat
Peristylus maingayi grows in swampy grassland, and grassy forest and woodland. It is found in Malesia, Cambodia, Vietnam, New Guinea and northern Australia where it occurs on the Cape York Peninsula and as far south as Proserpine.

References

Orchids of Queensland
Endemic orchids of Australia
Plants described in 1897
maingayi